"Calypso" is a song by Australian alternative rock band Spiderbait. It was released in April 1997 as the third single from the band's third studio album, Ivy and the Big Apples (1996). "Calypso" peaked at number 13 on the Australian ARIA Singles Chart, and it was ranked at number 23 on Triple J's Hottest 100 for 1997.

At the ARIA Music Awards of 1997, the song was nominated for Best Video, losing out to "Feelin' Kinda Sporty" by Dave Graney & the Coral Snakes.

Reception
Junkee said, "its main verse riff is essentially "Blitzkreig Bop" with a J Mascis makeover, while Janet English's code-switching vocals add a rousing sense of joy to proceedings. While Australian pop-punk may not be the house that Spiderbait built, they certainly still helped to put bricks in the wall."

Track listing

Charts

Weekly charts

Year-end charts

Release history

References

1996 songs
1997 singles
Polydor Records singles
Spiderbait songs